The Principality of Valona and Kanina, also known as the Despotate of Valona and Kanina or simply the Principality of Valona (1346–1417) was a medieval principality in Albania, roughly encompassing the territories of the modern counties of Vlorë (Valona), Fier, and Berat. Initially a vassal of the Serbian Empire, it became an independent lordship after 1355, although de facto under Venetian influence, and remained as such until it was conquered by the Ottoman Turks in 1417.

History 
The strategically important city of Valona, on the coast of modern Albania, had been fought over repeatedly between the Byzantines and various Italian powers in the 13th century. Finally conquered by Byzantium in ca. 1290, it was one of the chief imperial holdings in the Balkans. Byzantine rule lasted until the 1340s, when the Serbian ruler Stefan Dušan, taking advantage of a Byzantine civil war, took Albania. Valona fell in late 1345 or early 1346, and Dušan placed his brother-in-law, John Asen, brother of the Bulgarian Tsar Ivan Alexander, in charge of Valona as his capital, and with Kanina and Berat as his main fortresses. According to some scholars, however, Dušan had captured Valona and Kanina already in 1337. The extent of John's authority over this territory is unclear; it is not known whether he was limited to the rule of these fortified cities, or whether his authority was more extensive, with the various local chieftains of central Albania reporting to him as a representative of Dušan.

John was granted the rank of Despot by Dušan, and went on to solidify his control over his new territory by portraying himself as the heir to the Despots of Epirus. To that end, he married Anna Palaiologina, the widow of Despot John II Orsini, adopted the trappings of the Byzantine court, took on the surname "Komnenos" that was traditionally borne by the Epirote rulers, and signed his documents in Greek. After Dušan's death in 1355, John established himself as an independent lord. He maintained close relations with Venice (whose citizen he became) and with Simeon Uroš, ruler of Epirus in the south. Under his rule, Valona prospered through trade with Venice and the Republic of Ragusa (mod. Dubrovnik).

John died in 1363 from the plague, and was succeeded by Alexander, possibly his son, who ruled until ca. 1368. He continued his father's policies, maintaining close ties with Ragusa, whose citizenship he acquired. In 1372, John's unnamed daughter was married to Balša II of the Serbian Balšić noble family, who received Valona, Kanina, Berat and Himara as a dowry. Many of Valona's citizens fled to the island of Saseno and asked for Venetian protection. Balša continued to expand his territory in the western Balkans, inheriting Zeta in 1378 and conquering Dyrrhachium from Karl Topia soon after, whereupon he assumed the title "Duke of Albania", probably after the former Venetian province of the same name. Thopia called on the Ottomans for help however, and Balša was killed in the Battle of Savra near Berat in 1385. His widow Komnina recovered control of her patrimonial territory, and ruled it thereafter jointly with her daughter Ruđina. Berat however had already fallen to the Muzaka, and their lordship was now confined to the area around Valona, with Kanina, Himara and the fort of Pyrgos.

The principality was now faced with the ever-increasing Ottoman threat; in 1386, Balša's widow offered to cede Valona to Venice in exchange for aid, but the Republic refused, since Valona alone without her hinterland was indefensible. Following the decisive Ottoman victory at the Battle of Kosovo in 1389, the situation became yet more precarious. A similar offer in 1393 was also rejected by a Venice anxious not to antagonize the Ottomans, but another, more comprehensive proposal, followed two years later. Through the bishop of Albania, the widow offered to the handover of the entire principality in exchange for a lifelong pension for her and her family of some 7,000 ducats drawn, from the principality's revenue (estimated at 9,000 ducats). Negotiations faltered after the widow's death in 1396. She was succeeded by Ruđina, who in 1391 had married Mrkša Žarković. According to Italian sources, the principality was called the Kingdom of Serbia during Mrkša'a period. Threatened by Ottoman expansion, both Balša's widow and Mrkša repeatedly offered to surrender Valona and their principality to the Venetians, but they refused or procrastinated. After Mrkša's death in 1414, he was briefly succeeded by his widow Ruđina, until the Ottomans took the city in 1417.

The Venetian bailo at Constantinople tried to obtain the return of  the territory to Ruđina, who was a Venetian citizen, or alternatively purchase it for the Republic with up to 8,000 ducats, but nothing came of it. With the exception of a brief Venetian occupation in 1690–91, the region remained under Ottoman rule until the First Balkan War and the establishment of an independent Albanian state.

Rulers
John Komnenos Asen (1346–1363), Despot
Alexander Komnenos Asen (1363–1372), Lord of Valona and Kanina
Balša II Balšić (1372–1385), Lord of Kanina and Valona, and eventually Duke of Albania
 Komnina Balšić (1385–1396)
Mrkša Žarković (1396–1414), variously styled lord of Valona, lord of Kanina or King of Serbia
 Ruđina Balšić (1414–1417)

See also
 Albanian principalities
 History of Albania

Notes

References

Sources 
 
 
 
 
 
 

Medieval Epirus
Albanian principalities
Subdivisions of the Serbian Empire